František Blatný (2 April 1933 – 16 December 2015), was a Czech chess player, Czechoslovak Chess Championship medalist (1962, 1964), European Team Chess Championship team medalist (1957).

Biography
In Czechoslovak Chess Championship František Blatný for the first time took part in 1954. In 1962 he became a bronze medalist, and two years later, in 1964, he shared first place with Vlastimil Jansa, but lost to him the additional match for the title of champion. From 1965 to May 2011, he managed the chess section in the oldest newspaper Brno Rovnost.

František Blatný played for Czechoslovakia:
 in Chess Olympiads participated 2 times (1962-1964);
 in European Team Chess Championships participated 2 times (1957, 1970) and won team bronze medal (1957);
 in World Student Team Chess Championships participated 4 times (1955, 1957-1959) and won 2 team bronze medal (1957, 1958).

He was a father of grandmaster Pavel Blatný.

References

External links

František Blatný chess games at 365chess.com

1933 births
2015 deaths
Czechoslovak chess players
Czech chess players
Chess Olympiad competitors